Diisobutylaluminium hydride (DIBALH, DIBAL, DIBAL-H or DIBAH) is a reducing agent with the formula (i-Bu2AlH)2, where i-Bu represents isobutyl (-CH2CH(CH3)2). This organoaluminium compound is a reagent in organic synthesis.

Properties
Like most organoaluminum compounds, the compound's structure is most probably more than that suggested by its empirical formula. A variety of techniques, not including X-ray crystallography, suggest that the compound exists as a dimer and a trimer, consisting of tetrahedral aluminium centers sharing bridging hydride ligands.  Hydrides are small and, for aluminium derivatives, are highly basic, thus they bridge in preference to the alkyl groups.

DIBAL can be prepared by heating triisobutylaluminium (itself a dimer) to induce beta-hydride elimination:
(i-Bu3Al)2 → (i-Bu2AlH)2 + 2 (CH3)2C=CH2

Although DIBAL can be purchased commercially as a colorless liquid, it is more commonly purchased and dispensed as a solution in an organic solvent such as toluene or hexane.

Use in organic synthesis
DIBAL is useful in organic synthesis for a variety of reductions, including converting carboxylic acids, their derivatives, and nitriles to aldehydes. DIBAL efficiently reduces α-β unsaturated esters to the corresponding allylic alcohol. By contrast, LiAlH4 reduces esters and acyl chlorides to primary alcohols, and nitriles to primary amines [using Fieser work-up procedure].  DIBAL reacts slowly with electron-poor compounds, and more quickly with electron-rich compounds.  Thus, it is an electrophilic reducing agent whereas LiAlH4 can be thought of as a nucleophilic reducing agent.

Although DIBAL reliably reduces nitriles to aldehydes, the reduction of esters to aldehydes is infamous for often producing large quantities of alcohols. Nevertheless, it is possible to avoid these unwanted byproducts through careful control of the reaction conditions using continuous flow chemistry.

DIBALH was investigated originally as a cocatalyst for the polymerization of alkenes.

Safety
DIBAL, like most alkylaluminium compounds, reacts violently with air and water, potentially leading to explosion.

References

External links

Organoaluminium compounds
Metal hydrides
Reducing agents